The Autodromo Internazionale Enzo e Dino Ferrari, better known as Imola, is a  motor racing circuit in the town of Imola, in the Emilia-Romagna region of Italy,  east of Bologna. It is one of the few major international circuits to run in an anti-clockwise direction. The circuit is named after Ferrari's late founder, Enzo Ferrari (1898–1988), and his son, Alfredo "Dino" Ferrari (1932–1956). Before Enzo's death, it was called Autodromo Dino Ferrari. The circuit has an FIA Grade One licence.

Imola was the venue for the San Marino Grand Prix between 1981 and 2006. During this period, two Grands Prix were held in Italy every year, with the Italian Grand Prix taking place at Monza, so the Imola race was named after the nearby state. Imola also hosted the 1980 Italian Grand Prix in place of Monza. When Formula One visits Imola, it is seen as the home circuit of Scuderia Ferrari, and masses of supporters come out to support the local team.

The venue returned to the Formula One calendar during the 2020 season to help the sport fill calendar gaps caused by cancellations of other races due to the COVID-19 pandemic, with the race at the circuit being named the Emilia Romagna Grand Prix in honour of the region where the circuit is located. This also meant the venue hosted a World Championship race under a third different name having hosted the 1980 Italian Grand Prix and the San Marino Grand Prix from 1981 to 2006. In March 2022 Liberty Media signed a contract with the circuit to make it a permanent entry on the main calendar until at least 2025.

History

The track was originally called the Autodromo di Castellaccis, and inaugurated as a semi-permanent venue in 1953. It had no chicanes, so the runs from Acque Minerali to Rivazza, and from Rivazza all the way to Tosa, through the pits and the Tamburello, were just straights with a few small bends; the circuit remained in this configuration until 1972.

In April 1953, the first motorcycle races took place, while the first car race took place in June 1954. In April 1963, the circuit hosted its first Formula One race, as a non-championship event, won by Jim Clark for Lotus. A further non-championship event took place at Imola in 1979, which was won by Niki Lauda for Brabham-Alfa Romeo.

In 1980 Imola officially debuted in the Formula One World Championship calendar by hosting the 1980 Italian Grand Prix. It was the first time since the 1948 Edition held at Parco del Valentino that the Autodromo Nazionale Monza did not host the Italian Grand Prix. The race was held over 60 laps of the  circuit for a total race distance of 300 kilometres.

Imola has hosted a round of the Superbike World Championship from 2001 to 2006 and later since 2009. It hosts the final round of the FIM Motocross World Championship since 2018.

The World Touring Car Championship visited Imola in 2005 for the Race of San Marino, in 2008 for the Race of Europe, and in 2009 for the Race of Italy. The venue hosted a round of the International GT Open from 2009 to 2011 and also in 2021. The TCR International Series raced at Imola in 2016.

The 6 Hours of Imola was revived in 2011 and added to the Le Mans Series and Intercontinental Le Mans Cup as a season event until 2016, but it returned again to European Le Mans Series calendar again in 2022 as 4 Hours of Imola. It also hosted the 12 Hours of Imola in 2017-2018, a round of the 24H Series.

The track was also used as part of the finishing circuit for the 1968 UCI Road World Championships, which saw Italian cyclist Vittorio Adorni winning with a lead of 10 minutes and 10 seconds over runner up Herman Van Springel, the second largest winning margin in the history of the championships, after Georges Ronsse's victory in 1928. In addition Adorni's countryman Michele Dancelli took the bronze and five of the top six finishers were Italian. The circuit was used for stage 11 of the 2015 Giro d'Italia, which was won by Ilnur Zakarin, and stage 12 of the 2018 Giro d'Italia, won by Sam Bennett. The circuit also served as the start and finish of the 2020 UCI Road World Championships on 27 September 2020.

Tamburello 
Despite the addition of chicanes to several parts of the lap, such as the Acque Minerali, Variante Alta, and Variante Bassa, the circuit was subject to constant safety concerns, mostly regarding the flat-out Tamburello corner, which was very bumpy and had dangerously little room between the track and a concrete wall without a tyre barrier that separated the circuit from the Santerno river that runs adjacent to it.

In 1987, Nelson Piquet crashed heavily during practice after a tyre failure and missed the race due to injury. In 1989, Gerhard Berger crashed his Ferrari at Tamburello after a front wing failure. The car instantaneously ignited after the severe impact at  but thanks to the quick work of the firefighters and medical personnel Berger survived and missed only one race (the 1989 Monaco Grand Prix) due to burns to his hands. Michele Alboreto suffered a massive shunt whilst testing his Footwork Arrows at the circuit in 1991 but escaped injury. The following year, Riccardo Patrese also crashed at the same corner while testing for the Williams team.

In response to the deaths of Ayrton Senna and Roland Ratzenberger during the 1994 San Marino Grand Prix, modifications were carried out to the Tamburello corner to make it safer by converting it from a flat-out left hander to a left-right-left chicane.

1994 San Marino Grand Prix

In the 1994 San Marino Grand Prix, during Friday practice Rubens Barrichello was launched over a kerb and into the top of a tyre barrier at the Variante Bassa, knocking the Brazilian unconscious, though quick medical intervention saved his life. The tragedy continued the next day when the three-time World Champion Ayrton Senna lost control of his car and crashed into the concrete wall at the Tamburello corner on Lap 7. Senna died in the hospital several hours after his crash. In two unrelated incidents, several spectators and mechanics were also injured during the event.

In the aftermath, the circuit continued to host Grands Prix, but revisions were immediately made in an attempt to make it safer. The flat-out Tamburello corner was reduced to a 4th gear left–right sweeper, and a gravel trap was added to the limited space on the outside of the corner. Villeneuve corner, previously an innocuous 6th gear right-hander into Tosa, was made a complementary 4th gear sweeper, also with a gravel trap on the outside of the corner. In an attempt to retain some of the quickness and character of the old circuit, the arduous chicane at Acqua Minerali was eliminated, and the Variante Bassa was straightened into a single chicane. Many say that the new circuit configuration is not as good as it used to be as a result of the new chicanes at Tamburello and Villeneuve.

Another modification made to the Imola track is that of Variante Alta, which is situated at the top of the hill leading down to Rivazza and has the hardest braking point on the lap. The Variante Alta, formerly a high-kerbed chicane, was hit quite hard by the drivers which caused damage to the cars and occasionally was the site of quite a few accidents. Before the 2006 Grand Prix, the kerbs were lowered considerably and the turn itself was tightened to reduce speeds and hopefully reduce the number of accidents at the chicane.

The Grand Prix was removed from the calendar of the 2007 Formula One season. SAGIS, the company that owns the circuit, hoped that the race would be reinstated at the October 2006 meeting of the FIA World Motor Sport Council and scheduled for the weekend of 29 April 2007, provided renovations to the circuit were completed in time for the race, but the reinstatement was denied.

Recent developments

Since 2007, the circuit has undergone major revisions. A bypass to the Variante Bassa chicane was added for cars, making the run from Rivazza 2 to the first Tamburello chicane totally flat-out, much like the circuit in its original fast-flowing days. However, the chicane is still used for motorcycle races.

The old pit garages and paddock have been demolished and completely rebuilt while the pitlane was extended and resurfaced. The reconstruction was overseen by German F1 track architect Hermann Tilke.

In June 2008, with most of the reconstruction work completed, The FIA gave the track a "1T" rating, meaning that an official Formula One Test can be held at the circuit; circuits require the "1" homologation to host a Formula One Grand Prix. As of August 2011, the track received a '1' FIA homologation rating after an inspection by Charlie Whiting.

In June 2015, the owners of the circuit confirmed they were in talks to return to the Formula One calendar should Monza, whose contract was scheduled to run out after the  season, be unable to make a new deal to keep hosting a round of the world championship. On 18 July 2016, Imola signed a deal to host the Italian Grand Prix from the  season. However, on 2 September 2016, it was announced that Monza had secured a new deal to continue hosting the race, and Imola's officials took legal action against this decision questioning the legality of government funding awarded to Monza. On 8 November 2016, they withdrew their case. In February 2020, the owners at Imola submitted a bid to replace the 2020 Chinese Grand Prix pending its cancellation as a precaution in the face of the COVID-19 pandemic. On 24 July 2020, it was confirmed that the circuit would be added to the calendar for the 2020 Formula One World Championship with the race being called the "Emilia Romagna Grand Prix" in honour of the region the circuit is situated in. In a break with Formula One tradition the event at the circuit took place over two days instead of three on 31 October and 1 November 2020. Imola was kept on the calendar for 2021, following the postponement of the Chinese Grand Prix due to the ongoing pandemic, and later for the 2022 calendar as well. Imola is due to host a F1 Grand Prix until 2025.

The circuit's president is Giancarlo Minardi of the former Minardi F1 team.

Events

 Current

 April: Formula Regional European Championship, TCR Italian Series, Italian F4 Championship
 May: Formula One Emilia Romagna Grand Prix, FIA Formula 2 Championship, FIA Formula 3 Championship, Porsche Supercup, European Le Mans Series 4 Hours of Imola, Le Mans Cup, Ligier European Series, Lamborghini Super Trofeo Europe
 June: Porsche Sports Cup Suisse
 July: Superbike World Championship, Supersport World Championship, Supersport 300 World Championship
 October: Renault Clio Cup Europe, Italian GT Championship, TCR Italian Series, Porsche Carrera Cup Italy, CIV Superbike Championship

 Former

 24H Series 12 Hours of Imola (2017–2018)
 Auto GP (1999–2001, 2005–2006, 2010, 2014, 2016)
 BMW M1 Procar Championship (1980)
 BOSS GP (2012, 2014, 2016–2017, 2019–2020)
 Deutsche Tourenwagen Masters (2022)
 Euroformula Open Championship (2021–2022)
 European Formula Two Championship (1970–1972)
 European Touring Car Championship (1987, 2000, 2004)
 European Touring Car Cup (2012, 2016)
 Ferrari Challenge Finali Mondiali (2022)
 FIA European Formula 3 Championship (1977–1978, 1981, 1983)
 FIA Formula 3 European Championship (2014, 2016)
 FIA Formula Two Championship (2009)
 FIA GT Championship (2004–2005)
 FIM Endurance World Championship (1966, 1982, 2002–2003)
 Formula One Emilia Romagna Grand Prix (2020-2021)
 Formula Renault 2.0 Alps (2011–2015)
 Formula Renault Eurocup (2004, 2020)
 Formula Renault V6 Eurocup (2004)
 GP2 Asia Series (2011)
 GP2 Series (2005–2006)
 Grand Prix motorcycle racing
 City of Imola motorcycle Grand Prix (1996–1999)
 Italian motorcycle Grand Prix (1969, 1972, 1974–1975, 1977, 1979, 1988)
 San Marino motorcycle Grand Prix (1981, 1983)
 GT World Challenge Europe 3 Hours of Imola (2020, 2022)
 Imola 200 (1972–1978, 1980–1985)
 International Formula 3000 (1986–1987, 1998–2004)
 International GT Open (2009–2011, 2021)
 Lamborghini Super Trofeo World Finals (2017)
 Motocross World Championship (2019–2020)
 Sidecar World Championship (1974, 1983, 2001–2003)
 Superstars Series (2004–2006, 2009–2010, 2012–2013)
 TCR International Series (2016)
 World Sportscar Championship (1965, 1974, 1984)
 World Touring Car Championship (2005, 2008–2009)
 FIA WTCC Race of Europe (2008)
 FIA WTCC Race of Italy (2009)
 FIA WTCC Race of San Marino (2005)

Fatal accidents
Sauro Pazzagila - 1981 San Marino motorcycle Grand Prix (Qualifying)
Roland Ratzenberger - 1994 San Marino Grand Prix (Qualifying)
Ayrton Senna - 1994 San Marino Grand Prix (Race)

Lap records 
The official lap record for the current Grand Prix circuit layout is 1:15.484, set by Lewis Hamilton during the 2020 Emilia Romagna Grand Prix, while the unofficial all-time track record is 1:13.609, set by Valtteri Bottas in the qualifying of aforementioned race. The official race lap records at the Imola Circuit are listed as:

Non-motorsport events
Since 1981, the circuit has been hosting the early-September Mostra Scambio ("Trading Exposition"), an open-air market primarily focused on the exhibition and trade of vintage vehicles and their parts; this event is also popularly (but inaccurately) called CRAME, after the name of the historical society organizing it.
The 2020 edition was cancelled due to the COVID-19.

Among the major musical performances held on the track were:
 Heineken Jammin' Festival (1998–2006)
 Sonisphere (2011)
 AC/DC – Rock or Bust World Tour (2015)
 Laura Pausini – Pausini Stadi (2016)
 Guns N' Roses – Not in this Lifetime Tour (2017)
 Mario Biondi (2019)
 Pearl Jam – Gigaton Tour (2022)

Partially due to the vicinity of the Romeo Galli athletics stadium, the Acque Minerali park, and the Tre Monti hills, the Autodromo is not commonly used for bicycle or on-foot sporting activities (albeit with notable exceptions, such as two segments of the Giro d'Italia in the 2010s, and 2020 UCI Road World Championships); however, the civic administration does occasionally allocate summer days in which the public can walk or cycle along the track.

References

External links

Autodromo Enzo e Dino Ferrari
Autodromo Enzo e Dino Ferrari History and Statistics
Info from BBC's circuit guide
Track info from race-game.org
Satellite picture by Google Maps

Imola Circuit
Imola Circuit
Imola Circuit
Imola Circuit
Imola Circuit
Imola Circuit
Imola Circuit
Imola Circuit
Imola Circuit
Imola Circuit